Metallosia is a genus of moths in the subfamily Arctiinae. The genus was erected by George Hampson in 1900.

Species
 Metallosia chrysotis Hampson, 1900
 Metallosia nitens Schaus, 1911

References

External links

Lithosiini
Moth genera